Odd Winger (8 January 1923 – 4 February 1998) was a Norwegian journalist, novelist, and children's writer. He made his literary debut in 1953 with the novel Mot Land's End. He worked as a journalist for the newspaper Dagbladet from 1958. He was awarded the Gyldendal's Endowment in 1966.

References

1923 births
1998 deaths
People from Sør-Trøndelag
20th-century Norwegian novelists
Norwegian children's writers
20th-century Norwegian journalists